Fethard was a constituency in County Tipperary represented in the Irish House of Commons until its abolition on 1 January 1801.

History
In the Patriot Parliament of 1689 summoned by James II, Fethard was represented with two members.

Members of Parliament, 1608–1801
1560 Nicholas Hackett and Theobald Nash
1585 William Nash and David Wale
1613–1615 Edward Everard and Redmond Hackett
1634–1635 Thomas Everard and Thomas Hennes
1639–1649 Thomas Hennes and Patrick Vyne
1661–1666 Nicolas Everard and Sir Maurice Fenton, 1st Baronet

1689–1801

See also

Notes

Fethard, South Tipperary

References

Bibliography

Constituencies of the Parliament of Ireland (pre-1801)
Historic constituencies in County Tipperary
1608 establishments in Ireland
1800 disestablishments in Ireland
Constituencies established in 1608
Constituencies disestablished in 1800